Henry I (died 8 October 1291) was a Prince of Mecklenburg-Werle and Mecklenburg-Güstrow.

Biography
He was the son of Prince Nicholas I of Mecklenburg-Werle and his wife Princess Jutta of Anhalt the daughter of Prince Henry I of Anhalt and his wife Princess Irmgard of Thuringia. Henry and his brother John ruled Mecklenburg-Werle jointly following the death of their father on 10 May 1277.

Henry and his brother ruled jointly until 1283 when Henry founded the principality of Mecklenburg-Güstrow while John took up residence in the principality of Mecklenburg-Parchim which he ruled jointly with Prince Pribislaw II. Henry's reign in Güstrow came to an end on 8 October 1291 after he was murdered near Saal by his two sons Henry and Nicholas both of whom succeeded him.

Marriages and children
Henry was married twice; firstly in 1262 to Rikissa Birgersdotter (died 1288), with the following children:
Henry II of Werle (died 1308) married Beatrix of Pomerania (died 1315–16), daughter of Barnim I, Duke of Pomerania
Nicholas of Werle-Güstrow (died 1298)
Rixa of Werle (died 1317) married Albert II, Duke of Brunswick-Göttingen

He was married secondly in 1291 to Matilde of Brunswick-Lüneburg (died 1302) the daughter of John of Brunswick, Duke of Lüneburg.

References

1291 deaths
Year of birth unknown
House of Mecklenburg
Lords of Werle
13th-century German nobility